Michael Junior Omoh (born 29 August 1991) is a Nigerian professional footballer who plays for Liga I club as a midfielder.

Club career

In the summer of 2019 Omoh moved from first league side Örebro SK to Swedish second league club Mjällby AIF.

Club statistics

Honours
Mjällby
Superettan: 2019

References

External links

1991 births
Living people
Association football midfielders
Dalkurd FF players
Östersunds FK players
Nigerian footballers
Allsvenskan players
Örebro SK players
Mjällby AIF players
FC Politehnica Iași (2010) players
Hapoel Kfar Saba F.C. players
Maccabi Ahi Nazareth F.C. players
LPS HD Clinceni players
FCV Farul Constanța players
Superettan players
Ettan Fotboll players
Liga I players
Israeli Premier League players
Liga Leumit players
Nigerian expatriate footballers
Expatriate footballers in Sweden
Expatriate footballers in Romania
Expatriate footballers in Israel
Nigerian expatriate sportspeople in Sweden
Nigerian expatriate sportspeople in Romania
Nigerian expatriate sportspeople in Israel
Sportspeople from Warri
Nigerian expatriate sportspeople in Kuwait
Kazma SC players
Kuwait Premier League players
Expatriate footballers in Kuwait